Buffalo Presbyterian Church is a historic Presbyterian church located at Buffalo Township, Union County, Pennsylvania.  It was built in 1846, and is a one-story, brick and wood-frame building, three bays wide and four bays deep.  It features a full-width portico supported by four square columns.

It was listed on the National Register of Historic Places in 1976.

It is also known as the Old Buffalo Presbyterian Church and is listed as that on the American Presbyterian/Reformed Historic Sites Registry as its site # 271.

References

Presbyterian churches in Pennsylvania
Churches on the National Register of Historic Places in Pennsylvania
Churches completed in 1846
19th-century Presbyterian church buildings in the United States
Churches in Union County, Pennsylvania
National Register of Historic Places in Union County, Pennsylvania